The state of Maryland is served by the following area codes:

 240/301, which serve western Maryland, including its suburbs of Washington, D.C.
 410/443/667, which serve eastern Maryland including Baltimore and Annapolis.
A new area code 667 activated on March 24, 2012 for the eastern part of Maryland currently served by area codes 410 and overlay area code 443 and covering cities such as Aberdeen, Baltimore, Ellicott City and Dundalk. The introduction of the new code was decided back in 2001. Because this part of Maryland has 2 area codes already and, therefore, 10 digit dialing has been mandatory since the introduction of area code 443 in 1997, no permissive 10 digit dialing will be needed.

Area code list
 
Maryland
Area codes